Anutha Zone is the 21st studio album by American singer-songwriter Dr. John. The album was released on August 10, 1998, by Parlophone.

The album was recorded with contributions by Dr. John's regular touring band at the time and features guest performances of Paul Weller as well as rhythm section work by members of Spiritualized, Portishead, and Supergrass.

Track listing
All tracks composed by Mac Rebennack; except where noted.

References

1998 albums
Dr. John albums
Parlophone albums
Albums produced by John Leckie